A World of Piano! is an album by American jazz pianist Phineas Newborn Jr. recorded in 1961 and released on the Contemporary label in June 1962.

Reception
The Allmusic review by Scott Yanow states "the virtuosic Newborn is essentially the whole show anyway. He performs five jazz standards and three obscurities by jazz composers on this superb recital".

Track listing
 "Cheryl" (Charlie Parker) – 3:44
 "Manteca" (Dizzy Gillespie, Gil Fuller, Chano Pozo) – 4:18 		
 "Lush Life" (Billy Strayhorn) – 6:40
 "Daahoud" (Clifford Brown) – 4:40
 "Oleo" (Sonny Rollins) – 3:02
 "Juicy Lucy" (Horace Silver) – 4:50
 "For Carl" (Leroy Vinnegar) – 7:27
 "Cabu" (Roland Alexander) – 4:53 		  
Recorded at Contemporary Records Studio in Hollywood, CA on October 16 (tracks 1–4) and November 21 (tracks 5–8), 1961

Personnel
Phineas Newborn Jr. – piano
Paul Chambers (tracks 1–4), Sam Jones (tracks 5–8) – bass
Philly Joe Jones (tracks 1–4), Louis Hayes (tracks 5–8) – drums

References

Contemporary Records albums
Phineas Newborn Jr. albums
1962 albums